Irina Anto (Antonenko)  (born 1 September 1991) is an actress, model and beauty pageant titleholder who holds the title of Miss Russia 2010. She also placed in the Top 15 at the Miss Universe 2010 pageant held on August 23, 2010 in Las Vegas.

Life and career 
Irina Antonenko was born on 1 September 1991 in Magdeburg, Germany. Her parents, Natalia and Igor Antonenko, were both employees of the police. She completed her high school education in school No. 156. According to the school director, Irina was "a very modest and polite girl." Whilst studying at the school, Antonenko entered her first beauty pageant, in which she failed to make the top three. 
After finishing high school, she began to study finance at the Ural Finance and Jurisprudence Institute,  around the same time, she also started her modelling career.

In 2009, having won the title "Miss Yekaterinburg", Irina decided to go to Moscow to the national beauty contest. In mid-February 2010 it sent to the capital to take part in the preparations for the finals of "Miss Russia".

On 6 March 2010, Antonenko was crowned Miss Russia 2010 in a contest held in Moscow. The crown was handed over to her by outgoing titleholder Sofia Rudieva. In addition to the crown, she received a cash prize of $100,000, which she plans to spend mostly on charity, to help children who are ill.

After her coronation as Miss Russia, she started modelling for the world-famous designer Philipp Plein, and also participated in fashion shows by such designers as Olga Deffi, Alina Assi, Ilya Shiyan, Irina Natanova and Vyacheslav Zaitsev, one of the most well-known Russian fashion designers.

She represented Russia in the Miss Universe 2010 pageant held in the United States. Her final position was in the top 15.

While preparing for the Miss Universe 2010 competition, she stated that she doesn't have a boyfriend yet. "I haven’t got any time for boyfriends. My day begins with English classes and come to a end with fashion parade late in the evening. I rarely think about men now, but, of course, love is inside each of us." She will be accompanied by her mother and grandmother to Las Vegas where the contest is held. Her main dress at the competition was a $60,000 Empire style hand-made evening silk dress by Jacob Schaefer. As the traditional gift required by each participant, she brought hand-painted Matryoshkas. Each of them had a picture of one of the 2005-2009 Miss Universe winners.

Antonenko believes her best qualities are persistence, sincerity and friendliness, as well as drive and passion in the fight for victory.

In the same year, Irina Antonenko debuted as an actress in a movie. Her first job began shooting the film The Darkest Hour, a thriller directed by Chris Gorak, producer Timur Bekmambetov, Tom Jacobson, in a cameo role.

In 2019 she moved to the US and currently she lives in Los Angeles.

Filmography

References

External links

Irina Antonenko Official site
Miss Russia Official site

1991 births
Living people
Actors from Yekaterinburg
Miss Russia winners
Miss Universe 2010 contestants
Russian beauty pageant winners
Russian female models
Russian film actresses